Clinton Hall is a historic commercial building located at Ithaca in Tompkins County, New York. It was built in 1847-1851 and is a three-story, brick commercial block in the Greek Revival style.  The building is 66 feet long and 48 feet deep.

It was listed on the National Register of Historic Places in 1988.

References

External links

Commercial buildings on the National Register of Historic Places in New York (state)
Commercial buildings completed in 1851
Buildings and structures in Ithaca, New York
1851 establishments in New York (state)
National Register of Historic Places in Tompkins County, New York